The National Football League has held a player draft since 1936. Since 1936 there have been several franchises that have folded. This is a list of those franchises' first-round draft picks.

Baltimore Colts (1950)

Boston Yanks / New York Bulldogs/Yanks / Dallas Texans

1952 pick was made by New York Yanks. Yanks picks given to Dallas.

Brooklyn Dodgers/Tigers